The T-90 is a Russian main battle tank.

T90 may also refer to:

 Canon T90, an SLR film camera
 Cray T90, a supercomputer
 Chambers County-Winnie Stowell Airport (FFA LID T90)
 Type 90 tank, Japanese main battle tank
 T-90 antiaircraft tank, based on the Soviet T-70 (1943)
 Type-90 Chinese main battle tank, see Type 96 and Al-Khalid tank